Wilmott Charles "The Whip" Marshall (born December 1, 1931) is a Canadian retired ice hockey forward. Marshall holds all-time records for most goals, most points, most assists, most hat tricks, and most games played in the American Hockey League (AHL), registered over a 20-season career in the AHL.

Marshall also played with the Toronto Maple Leafs in the National Hockey League over the course of four seasons between 1953 and 1958.

The Willie Marshall Award, which is awarded to the AHL's leading goal scorer, is named after him.

Personal life
In his later years, Marshall became an avid author who self-published numerous volumes of Christian poetry and several nonfiction works on Christian history, theology, and doctrine. He later lived in Lebanon, Pennsylvania.

Career statistics

Regular season and playoffs

References

External links
 
AHL Hockey Hall of Fame bio

1931 births
Living people
Baltimore Clippers players
Buffalo Norsemen players
Canadian ice hockey centres
Hershey Bears players
Ice hockey people from Ontario
Pittsburgh Hornets players
Providence Reds players
Rochester Americans players
Sportspeople from Kirkland Lake
Toledo Hornets players
Toronto Maple Leafs players
Toronto St. Michael's Majors players